The toponym "British Isles" refers to a European archipelago consisting of Great Britain, Ireland, and adjacent islands. The word "British" is also an adjective and demonym referring to the United Kingdom and more historically associated with the British Empire. For this reason, the name British Isles is avoided by some, as such usage could be misrepresented to imply continued territorial claims or political overlordship of the Republic of Ireland by the United Kingdom.

Alternatives for the British Isles include "Britain and Ireland", the "Atlantic Archipelago", the "Anglo-Celtic Isles", the "British-Irish Isles", and the Islands of the North Atlantic. In documents drawn up jointly between the British and Irish governments, the archipelago is referred to simply as "these islands".

To some, the reasons to use an alternate name is partly semantic, as the term is a value-free geographic one, while, to others, it is a value-laden political one. The Channel Islands are normally included in the British Isles by tradition, though they are physically a separate archipelago from the rest of the isles. United Kingdom law uses the term British Islands to refer to the UK, Channel Islands, and Isle of Man as a single collective entity.

An early variant of the term British Isles dates back to Ancient Greek times, when they were known as the Pretanic Islands; this however seemingly fell into disuse for over a millennium in these islands, but remained in use elsewhere in Medieval Christendom, most especially Byzantium. It was introduced as the British Isles into English in the late 16th or early 17th centuries by English and Welsh writers, whose writings have been described as propaganda and politicised. The term became more controversial after the breakup of the United Kingdom of Great Britain and Ireland in 1922.

The names of the archipelago's two sovereign states were themselves the subject of a long dispute between the Irish and British governments.

Perspectives in Great Britain
In general, the use of the term British Isles to refer to the archipelago is common and uncontroversial within Great Britain, at least since the concept of "Britishness" was gradually accepted in Britain after the 1707 Act of Union. In Britain it is commonly understood as being a politically neutral geographical term, although it is sometimes used to refer to the United Kingdom or Great Britain alone.

In 2003, Irish newspapers reported a British Government internal briefing that advised against the use of "British Isles". There is evidence that its use has been increasingly avoided in recent years in fields like cartography and in some academic work, such as Norman Daviess history of Britain and Ireland The Isles: A History. As a purely geographical term in technical contexts (such as geology and natural history), there is less evidence of alternative terms being chosen.  Recent histories of Great Britain and Ireland (published by major British academic publishers such as the Oxford and Cambridge University presses) have discussed the acceptability of the term "British Isles" in Ireland, although one study continues to use the term "for convenience".

Recognition of issues with the term (as well as problems over definitions and terminology) was also discussed by the columnist Marcel Berlins, writing in The Guardian in 2006. Beginning with "At last, someone has had the sense to abolish the British Isles", he opines that "although purely a geographical definition, it is frequently mixed up with the political entities Great Britain, or the United Kingdom. Even when used geographically, its exact scope is widely misunderstood". He also acknowledges that some view the term as representing Britain's imperial past, when it ruled the whole of Ireland. Another historian of British and Irish history has described the term as "politically loaded".

Perspectives in Ireland

Republic of Ireland
From the Irish perspective, some consider "The British Isles" as a political term rather than a geographical name for the archipelago. The term "British" had also never applied to Ireland until at least the late 16th century and onwards. This period coincided with the Tudor conquest of Ireland, the subsequent Cromwellian activities in Ireland, the Williamite accession in Britain and the Williamite War in Ireland—all of which resulted in severe impact on the Irish people, landowners and native aristocracy. From that perspective, the term "British Isles" is not a neutral geographical term but an unavoidably political one. Use of the name "British Isles" is often rejected in the Republic of Ireland, because some claim its use implies a primacy of British identity over all the islands outside the United Kingdom, including the Irish state and the Crown dependencies of the Isle of Man and Channel Islands, that was historically dominating and is currently inaccurate, since Ireland is neither Britain nor British.

Many political bodies, including the Irish government, avoid describing Ireland as being part of the British Isles; Éamon de Valera corrected John Gunther when the journalist used the term during a private meeting in the mid-1930s. However, the term "British Isles" has been used by individual ministers, as did cabinet minister Síle de Valera when delivering a speech including the term at the opening of a drama festival in 2002, and is used by government departments in relation to geographic topics. The term was formally disavowed in September 2005 by the Irish Government when Foreign Minister Dermot Ahern stated: "The British Isles is not an officially recognised term in any legal or inter-governmental sense. It is without any official status. The Government, including the Department of Foreign Affairs, does not use this term."

"British Isles" has been used in a geographical sense in Irish parliamentary debates by government ministers, although it is often used in a way that defines the British Isles as excluding the Republic of Ireland. In October 2006, Irish educational publisher Folens announced that it was removing the term from its popular school atlas effective in January 2007. The decision was made after the issue was raised by a geography teacher. Folens stated that no parent had complained directly to them over the use of "British Isles" and that they had a policy of acting proactively, upon the appearance of a "potential problem". This attracted press attention in the UK and Ireland, during which a spokesman for the Irish Embassy in London said, "'The British Isles' has a dated ring to it, as if we are still part of the Empire". A bilingual dictionary website maintained by Foras na Gaeilge translates "British Isles" into Irish as  "Ireland and Great Britain".

Northern Ireland
Different views on terminology are probably most clearly seen in Northern Ireland (which covers six of the thirty-two counties in Ireland), where the political situation is difficult and national identity contested.  A survey in Northern Ireland found that Unionists generally considered the British Isles to be a natural geographical entity, considering themselves British and are mainly descendants of British settlers in Ireland. Another survey highlighted the British and Irish identity of the Protestant community, showing that 51% of Protestants felt "not at all Irish" and 41% only "weakly Irish". In contrast, Nationalists considered their community to be that of the Irish nation—a distinct cultural and political community extending across the whole of Ireland. Identities were diverse and multi-layered, and Irishness was a highly contested identity; Nationalists expressed difficulty in understanding Unionist descriptions of Britishness.

The overall opinion of the Northern Irish people about the term (like the opinion of those in the Republic of Ireland and Great Britain) has never been formally gauged. Politicians from the Irish Unionist tradition readily use the term "British Isles"; the contrast between Unionist and Nationalist approaches to the term was shown in December 1999 at a meeting of the Irish Cabinet and Northern Ireland Executive in Armagh. The First Minister of Northern Ireland, David Trimble, told the meeting:

In contrast, the Taoiseach, Bertie Ahern, did not use the term in his address to the meeting.

At a gathering of the British–Irish Inter-Parliamentary Body in 1998, sensitivity about the term became an issue. Referring to plans for the proposed British–Irish Council (supported by both Nationalists and Unionists), British MP for Falkirk West Dennis Canavan was paraphrased by official note-takers as having said in a caveat:

In a series of documents issued by the United Kingdom and Ireland, from the Downing Street Declaration to the Good Friday Agreement (Belfast Agreement), relations in the British Isles were referred to as the "East–West strand" of the tripartite relationship.

Alternative terms
There is no single accepted replacement of the term British Isles. However, the terms Great Britain and Ireland, British Isles and Ireland, Islands of the North Atlantic etc. are suggested.

British Isles and Ireland
The term British Isles and Ireland has been used in a variety of contexts—among others religious, medical, zoologic, academic and others. This form is also used in some book titles and legal publications.

Islands of the North Atlantic (or IONA)
In the context of the Northern Ireland peace process, the term "Islands of the North Atlantic" (and its acronym, IONA) was a term created by then-Conservative Party MP Sir John Biggs-Davison. It has been used as a term to denote either all the islands, or the two main islands, without referring to the two states.

IONA has been used by (among others) the former Irish Taoiseach (Prime Minister), Bertie Ahern:

Others have interpreted the term more narrowly to mean the "Council of the Isles" or "British-Irish Council".  MP Peter Luff told the British House of Commons in 1998 that

His interpretation is not widely shared, particularly in Ireland.  In 1997 the leader of the Irish Green Party Trevor Sargent, discussing the Strand Three (or East–West) talks between the Republic of Ireland and the United Kingdom, commented in Dáil Éireann (the Irish House of Representatives):

His comments were echoed by Proinsias De Rossa, then leader of the Democratic Left and later President of the Irish Labour Party, who told the Dáil, "The acronym IONA is a useful way of addressing the coming together of these two islands."

Criticism
The neologism has been criticised on the grounds that it excludes most of the islands in the North Atlantic.

The name is also ambiguous, because of the other islands in the North Atlantic which have never been considered part of the British Isles.

West European Isles
The name "West European Isles" is one translation of the islands' name in the Gaelic languages of Irish and Manx, with equivalent terms for "British Isle". In Irish,  (literally "Ireland and Great Britain") is the more common term.

A somewhat similar usage exists in Iceland. "Westman" is the Icelandic name for a person from the Gaelic areas of Britain and Ireland (Ireland, Scotland and the Isle of Man), and "the Western Lands" is the translation of the name for the islands in Icelandic.

Some academics in the 1990s and early 2000s also used the term "Northwest European archipelago"; however, its use appears sporadically in historiography and is rare outside it.

Other terms
these islands common among Irish public officials, although as a deictic label it cannot be used outside the islands in question. Charles Haughey referred to his 1980 discussions with Margaret Thatcher on "the totality of relationships in these islands"; the 1998 Good Friday Agreement also uses "these islands" and not "British Isles".
Insular an adjective, meaning "island based", used as a qualifier in cultural history up to the early medieval period, as for example insular art, insular script, Insular Celtic, Insular Christianity. 
Atlantic Archipelago introduced by historian J. G. A. Pocock in 1975, 'since the term "British Isles" is one which Irishmen reject and Englishmen decline to take quite seriously'. It has been adopted by some later academic historians.

Names of the islands through the ages

In classical times, several Greco-Roman geographers used derivatives of the Celtic languages' term Pretani (such as "Brit-" or "Prit-" with various endings) to refer to the islands northwest of the European mainland; several included islands not currently viewed as part of the "British Isles"—Thule, for example. During the Roman era, the word "Britannia" came to mean the Roman province of Britain in particular.

Other early classical geographers (and native sources in the post-Roman period) used the general term , which meant "islands of the ocean". Great Britain was called "Britannia"; Ireland was known as "Hibernia" and, between about the 5th and 11th centuries, "Scotia". The Orkney Islands ("Orcades") and the Isle of Man were typically also included in descriptions of the islands. No collective term for the islands was used other than "islands of the Ocean".

The Latin version of "British Isles" seemingly came to be used again in Western Europe with the translation of Ptolemy's Geographica (Geography) in the 14th century, but the work had remained available to scholars in Eastern Europe from the 2nd century to at least the 13th century with John Tzetzes in Constantinople and Metropolitan Eustathios in Thessaloniki, who preserved the title of the treatise as Geographike Hyphegesis. Moreover, it was not usual for Byzantine scholars and clerics to travel to Western Europe prior to the Schism. Theodore of Tarsus (602-690), for example, travelled to England c.669 after being appointed archbishop of Canterbury. Byzantine-born Theodore had a profound effect on the church in England, both as an administrator and scholar, and established schools, such as at St. Augustine, Canterbury. The close relationship (not always friendly) between the Italian mercantile states and Constantinople means that it is increasingly problematic to present the Late Medieval translation of Geographica as evidence of a previous ignorance of his work. Venice had been established as a Byzantine colony and its seafarers were unlikely to forget Byzantine geography immediately on gaining independence. This demonstrates the continuing influence of Ptolemy's geographical framework in south-eastern Europe, and that people and ideas continued to move between East and West Christendom in the Middle Ages.

By the middle of the 16th century the term appears on maps made by geographers including George Lily and Sebastien Munster. The term "British Isles" entered the English language in the late 16th century to refer to Great Britain, Ireland and the surrounding islands.  In general, the modern notion of "Britishness" evolved after the 1707 Act of Union. While it is probably the most common term for the islands, this use is not universally accepted and is generally rejected in parts of Ireland.

Pretanic Islands and Britanniae
The earliest known names for the islands come from Greco-Roman writings. Sources included the Massaliote Periplus (a merchants' handbook from around 500 BC describing sea routes) and the travel writings of the Greek, Pytheas, from around 320 BC. Although the earliest texts have been lost, excerpts were quoted or paraphrased by later authors. The main islands were called "Ierne", equal to the term Ériu for Ireland, and "Albion" for present-day Great Britain. It is often taken as a reference to the practice by the inhabitants of painting (or tattooing) their skin; since it is unusual for an autonym (a self-description) to describe appearance, this name may have been used by Armoricans. There is considerable confusion about early use of these terms and the extent to which similar terms were used as self-description by the inhabitants. Cognates of these terms are still in use.

The island group had long been known collectively as the Pretanic or Britanic isles. As explained by Pliny the Elder, this included the Orcades (Orkney), the Hæbudes (Hebrides), Mona (Anglesey), Monopia (Isle of Man), and a number of other islands less certainly identifiable from his names. The deduced Celtic name for Ireland – Iverio – from which its present name was derived, was known to the Greeks by the 4th century BC at least, possibly as early as the 6th century BC. The name meant "the fertile land". It was Latinised to Hiernia or Hibernia. Its people were the Iverni.

In 55 and 54 BC, Caesar's invasions of Britain brought firsthand knowledge; in his Commentarii de Bello Gallico, he introduced the term Britannia.

Around AD 70, Pliny the Elder, in Book 4 of his Naturalis Historia, describes the islands he considers to be "Britanniae" as including Great Britain, Ireland, Orkney, smaller islands such as the Hebrides, the Isle of Man, Anglesey, possibly one of the Frisian Islands, and islands which have been identified as Ushant and Sian. He refers to Great Britain as the island called "Britannia", noting that its former name was "Albion". The list also includes the island of Thule, most often identified as Iceland—although some express the view that it may have been the Faroe Islands—the coast of Norway or Denmark, or possibly Shetland.

The classical writer Claudius Ptolemy, referred to the larger island as great Britain (megale Bretannia) and to Ireland as little Britain (Μικρὰ Βρεττανία / mikra Brettania) in his work, Almagest (147–148 AD). In his later work, Geography (c. 150 AD), he gave these islands the names Alwion[sic], Iwernia, and Mona (the Isle of Man), suggesting these may have been native names of the individual islands not known to him at the time of writing Almagest. The name Albion appears to have fallen out of use sometime after the Roman conquest of Great Britain, after which Britain became the more commonplace name for the island called Great Britain.

Ptolemy included essentially the same main islands in the Britannias. He wrote around AD 150, although he used the now-lost work of Marinus of Tyre from about fifty years earlier. His first description is of Ireland, which he called "Hibernia". Second was the island of Great Britain, which he called "Albion". Book II, Chapters 1 and 2 of his Geography are respectively titled as Hibernia, Island of Britannia and Albion, Island of Britannia. Ptolemy included Thule in the chapter on Albion, although the coordinates he gives have been mapped to the area around modern Kristiansund in western Norway. The famous Geography of Claudius Ptolemy, written in Greek c. 150 AD, included the British Isles. Ptolemy relied on the work of an earlier geographer, Marinos of Tyre. So the Geography generally reflects the situation c. 100 AD and he retained the names used for the islands by Pliny the Elder: Albion for Britain, and Ierne (Latinised as Hibernia) for Ireland.

Following the conquest of AD 43 the Roman province of Britannia was established, and Roman Britain expanded to cover much of the island of Great Britain. An invasion of Ireland was considered but never undertaken, and Ireland remained outside the Roman Empire. The Romans failed to consolidate their hold on the Scottish Highlands; the northern extent of the area under their control (defined by the Antonine Wall across central Scotland) stabilised at Hadrian's Wall across the north of England by about AD 210. Inhabitants of the province continued to refer to themselves as "Brittannus" or "Britto", and gave their patria (homeland) as "Britannia" or as their tribe. The vernacular term "Priteni" came to be used for the barbarians north of the Antonine Wall, with the Romans using the tribal name "Caledonii" more generally for these peoples who (after AD 300) they called Picts.

The post-conquest Romans used Britannia or Britannia Magna (Large Britain) for Britain, and Hibernia or Britannia Parva (Small Britain) for Ireland. The post-Roman era saw Brythonic kingdoms established in all areas of Britain except the Scottish Highlands, but coming under increasing attacks from Picts, Scotti and Anglo-Saxons. At this time Ireland was dominated by the Gaels or Scotti, who subsequently gave their names to Ireland and Scotland.

Oceani insulae
In classical geography, the Mediterranean world was thought to be surrounded by a fast-flowing river, personified as the Titan Oceanus. As a result, islands off the north and west shores of continental Europe were termed (in Latin) the Oceani Insulae or "islands of the Ocean." In AD 43, various islands (including Britain, Ireland, and Thule) were referred to as Septemtrionalis Oceani Insulae ("islands of the Northern Ocean") by Pomponius Mela, one of the earliest Roman geographers.

This term was also used by indigenous sources during the post-Roman period, who also used the term Oceani Insulae as a term for the islands in the Atlantic and elsewhere. One such example is the Life of Saint Columba, a hagiography recording the missionary activities of the 6th century Irish monk Saint Columba among the peoples of modern-day Scotland. It was written in the late 7th century by Adomnán of Iona, an Irish monk living on the Inner Hebridean island. No Priteni-derived collective reference is made.  Jordanes, writing in his AD 551 Getica, describes the islands (particularly in the Western Ocean) as "islands of the Ocean"; he named various islands in the North Atlantic, and believed Scandinavia to be one of them. He described Britain, but does not mention Ireland.

Another native source to use the term is the Historia ecclesiastica gentis Anglorum of Bede, written in the early 8th century. Bede's work does not have a collective term for the archipelago, referring to "Brittania" solely as the island "formerly called Albion" and treating Ireland separately. As with Jordanes and Columba, he refers to Britain as being Oceani insula or "island of the Ocean".

Isidore of Seville's Etymology, written in the early 7th century and one of the most popular textbooks in Europe during the Middle Ages, similarly lists Britain ("Britannia"), Ireland ("Scotia" or "Hibernia"), Thule, and many other islands simply as "islands" or "islands of the Ocean" and uses no collective term.

In the 17th century, Peter Heylin, in his Microcosmus, described the classical conception of the Ocean and included in the "Iles of the Ocean" all the classically known offshore islands—Zealand, the British Isles, and those in the "Northerne Sea".

British Isles

In his Historia Regum Britanniae of around 1136, Geoffrey of Monmouth responded to the slights of English historians with his theme of the sovereignty of Britain—exalting Welsh national history, portraying a once-unified Britannia (founded by Brutus of Troy) defended by King Arthur's Britons against Anglo-Saxon invasion. Arthur (who was now sleeping) would one day return to the rescue. By the end of the twelfth century this adaptation of myths common to Wales, Cornwall and Brittany had been adapted in the service of England—with Henry II of England enthusiastically taking up Arthurian legend, and Edward I of England putting on pageantry to show the Welsh that he was Arthur's heir. The Welsh (and the Scots' Edward Bruce) used the legends to find common cause as one "kin and nation" in driving the English out of Britain. Both Welsh rebels and English monarchs (particularly Henry Tudor) continued such claims; Henry had Welsh ancestry, and claimed descent from Arthur. His son Henry VIII incorporated Wales into England; he also claimed to be an heir of Arthur, as did his successor Elizabeth I of England.

The rediscovery of Ptolemy's Geographia by Maximus Planudes in 1300 brought new insight, and circulation of copies widened when it was translated into Latin in 1409. This spread Ptolemy's naming of Hibernia and Albion as "Island[s] of Britannia". The Latin equivalents of terms equating to "British Isles" started to be used by mapmakers from the mid-16th century onwards; George Lily published a map in 1548 entitled "Britannicae Insulae"; Sebastian Münster in Geographia Universalis (a 1550 reissue of Ptolemy's Geography) uses the heading De insulis Britannicis, Albione, quæ est Anglia, & Hibernia, & de cuiutatibus carum in genere. Gerardus Mercator produced much more accurate maps, including one of "the British Isles" in 1564. Ortelius, in his Atlas of 1570, uses the title Angliae, Scotiae et Hiberniae, sive Britannicar. insularum descriptio. This translates as "A Representation of England, Scotland and Ireland, or Britannica's Islands".

The geographer and occultist John Dee (of Welsh ancestry) was an adviser to Queen Elizabeth I of England and prepared maps for several explorers. He helped to develop legal justifications for colonisation by Protestant England, breaking the duopoly the Pope had granted to the Spanish and Portuguese Empires. Dee coined the term "British Empire" and built his case, in part, on the claim of a "British Ocean"; including Britain, Ireland, Iceland, Greenland and (possibly) North America, he used alleged Saxon precedent to claim territorial and trading rights. Current scholarly opinion is generally that "his imperial vision was simply propaganda and antiquarianism, without much practical value and of limited interest to the English crown and state." The Lordship of Ireland had come under tighter English control as the Kingdom of Ireland, and diplomatic efforts (interspersed with warfare) tried to bring Scotland under the English monarch as well. Dee used the term "Brytish Iles" in his writings of 1577, which developed his arguments claiming these territories. This appears to be the first use of a recognisable version of the modern term.

Elizabeth was succeeded by her cousin, King James VI of Scotland, who brought the English throne under his personal rule as King James I of England—proclaiming himself as "King of Great Brittaine, France and Ireland". However, the states remained separate until the monarchy was overthrown in the civil wars of the Three Kingdoms; the Commonwealth of England briefly ruled all, before the restoration of the monarchy restored separate states.

The Oxford English Dictionary asserts that the first published use in English of "British Isles" was in 1621 (before the civil wars) by Peter Heylin (or Heylyn) in his Microcosmus: a little description of the great world (a collection of his lectures on historical geography). Writing from his English political perspective, he grouped Ireland with Great Britain and the minor islands with these three arguments:
The inhabitants of Ireland must have come from Britain as it was the nearest land
He notes that ancient writers (such as Ptolemy) called Ireland a Brttiʃh Iland
He cites the observation of the first-century Roman writer Tacitus that the habits and disposition of the people in Ireland were not much unlike the Brittaines

Modern scholarly opinion is that Heylyn "politicised his geographical books Microcosmus ... and, still more, Cosmographie" in the context of what geography meant at that time. Heylyn's geographical work must be seen as political expressions concerned with proving (or disproving) constitutional matters, and "demonstrated their authors' specific political identities by the languages and arguments they deployed." In an era when "politics referred to discussions of dynastic legitimacy, of representation, and of the Constitution ... [Heylyn's] geography was not to be conceived separately from politics."

Following the Acts of Union of 1707 the Kingdom of Great Britain and conflict with France brought a new popular enthusiasm for Britishness (mostly in Britain itself), and the term British Isles came into common use despite the persistent stirrings of Irish nationalism. A desire for some form of Irish independence had been active throughout the centuries, with Poynings' Law a common focus of resentment. After the hugely turbulent 16th and 17th centuries, nationalism surfaced among the Irish Protestant population and eventually led to the legislative independence of the Irish Parliament under Henry Grattan—followed after the Act of Union (1800) by the renewed assertiveness of Irish Catholics, who first agitated for Catholic Emancipation and later for Repeal of the Union under Daniel O'Connell.

The Great Irish Famine, the Land War and the failure of William Ewart Gladstone and Charles Stuart Parnell to get partial independence (a Bill for Home Rule) through the Westminster Parliament led to the secession of most of Ireland from the United Kingdom. This meant the end of British rule in most of Ireland.

See also
 Macedonia naming dispute

Footnotes

References

.

Geographical naming disputes
Political terms in the United Kingdom
Politics of Ireland
Naming dispute
Ireland–United Kingdom relations
Naming dispute